Lee Bell is an unincorporated community in Randolph County, West Virginia, United States.  It was reportedly named after Leander "Lee" Bell who was born in 1885 in Joker, Calhoun County, West Virginia.

References 

Unincorporated communities in West Virginia
Unincorporated communities in Randolph County, West Virginia